Yanna Lavigne Inagaki Gissoni (born 29 November 1989) is a Brazilian television actress and model.

Biography 
Born in Osasco, she is the daughter of a Japanese man and a woman from Bahia state, due to her exotic looks, her school colleagues in Nagoya suggested her to compete in the Aichi province's local beauty contest in 2006. After she was discovered by a Brazilian scout, she worked as a model in Tokyo. She returned to Brazil when she was 19 years old and studied at Rede Globo's actors school.

She is of Japanese, French and Spanish descent.

Career 
Her television debut was in the Fantástico's sketch named “O Cupido”, in 2010, and in 2011 she guest starred in several episodes of the telenovela Malhação. The actress played a promiscuous girl in the 2012 telenovela Avenida Brasil. Yanna Lavigne was part of the main cast of the 2013 telenovela Salve Jorge as a Turkish woman named Tamar. She played Ana Fátima, who was one of the protagonists, in the 2013 telenovela Além do Horizonte. Yanna Lavigne played a victim of a homicide in the 2014 police TV series Dupla Identidade, by Glória Perez. She guest starred in the 2015 telenovela Babilônia as Susana, who is the mistress of the dishonest mayor Aderbal, played by Marcos Palmeira.

Saltibum 

Yanna Lavigne competed in the 2015 edition of the Rede Globo's Saltibum reality show, which is a segment of the Caldeirão do Huck program and it is the Brazilian version of the Dutch reality TV show Celebrity Splash!.

Television

Awards and nominations

References

External links 
 
 

1989 births
Living people
Actresses from Osasco
Brazilian people of Japanese descent
Brazilian people of French descent
Brazilian people of Spanish descent
Brazilian telenovela actresses
Brazilian television actresses
Brazilian female models